Hemin is a given name. Notable people with the given name include:

 Hemin Desai (born 1977), Indian-born Omani cricketer
 Hemin Hawrami (born 1976), Kurdish politician, writer, and academic
 Hemin Mukriyani (1921–1986), Kurdish poet, journalist, translator, and literary critic

Masculine given names